

Location

Cerro el Muerto (sometimes El Muerto fully translated as The Dead One ") is a range or area at the border of Argentina and Chile. It's located at Atacama Region, Copiapó Province, at the Puna de Atacama. It only receives a handful of climbing attempts every year and most are from the Chilean side.

Elevation

It has an official height of 6488 meters, however, based on the elevation provided by the available Digital elevation models, SRTM (6490m), ASTER (6488m), SRTM filled with ASTER (6490m), TanDEM-X(6533m), and also a handheld GPS survey by Maximo Kausch on 12/2010 (6519 meters), Muerto is about 6510 meters above sea level.

The height of the nearest key col is 4414 meters. so its prominence is 2096 meters. Muerto is listed as range or area, based on the Dominance system  and its dominance is 32.2%. Its parent peak is Ojos del Salado and the Topographic isolation is 8 kilometers. This information was obtained during a research by Suzanne Imber in 2014.

See also
List of mountains in Argentina

External links
Elevation information about Muerto
Weather Forecast at Muerto
Cerro el Muerto at Tageo.com

References

Volcanoes of Catamarca Province
Mountains of Argentina
Mountains of Chile
Argentina–Chile border
International mountains of South America
Volcanoes of Atacama Region
Six-thousanders of the Andes